Jindalee State School (JSS) is a co-educational primary school in the western Brisbane suburb of Jindalee, Queensland. It caters to students from Prep to Grade 6, and is a feeder school to Centenary State High School. The current enrollment number of children is around 977, compared to a peak of 981 in 1981.

History

The first school in the Centenary area was the Seventeen Mile Rocks Provisional School, which opened in 1870. After the opening of the Centenary suburbs to residential development, Jindalee State School was opened on Burrendah Road in 1966, with an original enrolment of 64. Since then the school has grown far larger, with the opening of more "blocks" over the years, culminating with the opening of the school hall in 1998 and the renovation of a new block in front of the school hall, called H8 and H7 in 2006 and the Kirinari block behind the Hall in 2011.

House system

Laptop Curriculum
During 2009, Jindalee was the first school in the Centenary suburbs to have laptop classes, in which students do most of their work digitally on laptops. However, the Laptop program was discontinued in 2015 due to the new "BYOD (Bring Your Own Device)" classes.

Sports

Jindalee State School has a comprehensive sports and skills program. The specialist physical education teacher conducts each class every week.

The school has two tennis courts, and two multipurpose courts for basketball and netball. Volleyball and basketball are primarily played in the school hall. The school also boasts one of the best sporting ovals in the district.

Swimming lessons are provided to all year levels in either term one or term four. Lessons are held at the Jindalee Swimming Pool. Children are transported to and from the pool by bus. There is a fee charged for transport and pool hire. Lessons are conducted by school staff.

Inter – School Sport

Year 5 and 6 children participate in a wide variety of inter-school sports. These may include:

Netball, Softball, Soccer, Australian Rules, Swimming, Basketball, Touch, Cross-Country Running and Athletics.

Our school has a number of staff who assist in coaching and sports offered at particular times may depend on student interest and program options. Selection processes operate for interschool sports participation.

Teams travel to various venues to take part in matches. In most sports, the school provides equipment and any specialized uniforms that are required. Team members are required to adhere to the School’s Code of Behavior and school dress code at all times. Students participating in the Interschool Sports program pay a levy to help defray costs of this program.

Curriculum

Intercultural Investigations (IcIs)

Intercultural Investigations (IcIs) is an alternative to KLA LOTE. IcIs aims to lead students into an exploration of the interrelationship of language and culture. The language-culture nexus is central to IcIs, the emphasis being on the use of language (both English and LOTE) for inquiry into culture. IcIs aims to move beyond fostering awareness and understanding. It seeks to help students become interculturally competent players as well as sensitive observers. IcIs is an alternative to, or an antecedent to, KLA LOTE.

References 

Public primary schools in Brisbane
Educational institutions established in 1966
1966 establishments in Australia